Jere Seppala (born January 4, 1993) is a Finnish professional ice hockey defenceman. His is currently playing with Espoo Blues in the Finnish Liiga.

Seppala made his Liiga debut playing with Espoo Blues during the 2013–14 Liiga season.

References

External links

1993 births
Living people
Espoo Blues players
Finnish ice hockey defencemen
People from Kemi
Sportspeople from Lapland (Finland)